Willow and Stumpy is an animated feature on the Sky Sports TV channel in the United Kingdom. It is accessible using the red button on the remote control when Live Cricket is being shown.

The feature is designed to aid understanding of the rules of cricket, often using diagrams as a visual aid. Willow, the seasoned cricket bat, answers questions put by the younger, more naïve Stumpy, who is one of the stumps.

Episodes
Individual episodes of Willow and Stumpy explain the following aspects of cricket:
 Silly Mid-off
 Night Watchman
 No Ball
 The Googly
 Legside Offside
 The Ball
 The Crease
 Extras
 Round the Wicket and Over the Wicket
 The Yorker
 Swing Bowling
 The Doosra
 Slips
 Fine Leg
 Reverse Swing

References

British children's animated sports television series